A wealth tax (also called a capital tax or equity tax) is a tax on an entity's holdings of assets. This includes the total value of personal assets, including cash, bank deposits, real estate, assets in insurance and pension plans, ownership of unincorporated businesses, financial securities, and personal trusts (a one-off levy on wealth is a capital levy). Typically, liabilities (primarily mortgages and other loans) are deducted from an individual's wealth, hence it is sometimes called a net wealth tax.

, five of the 36 OECD countries had a personal wealth tax (down from 12 in 1990). 

Proponents note that it can reduce income inequality by reducing the accumulation of large amounts of wealth by individuals. Critics note that a wealth tax can cause wealthy entrepreneurs and businesspeople to leave the country and move their wealth to a more tax friendly nation.

In practice

 require declaration of the taxpayer's balance sheet (assets and liabilities), and from that ask for a tax on net worth (assets minus liabilities), as a percentage of the net worth, or a percentage of the net worth exceeding a certain level. Wealth taxes can be limited to natural persons or they can be extended to also cover legal persons such as corporations. In 1990, about a dozen European countries had a wealth tax, but by 2019, all but three had eliminated the tax because of the difficulties and costs associated with both design and enforcement. Belgium, Norway, Spain, and Switzerland are the countries that raised revenue from net wealth taxes on individuals in 2019 with net wealth taxes accounting for 1.1% of overall tax revenues in Norway, 0.55% in Spain, and 3.6% in Switzerland for 2017.

According to an OECD study on wealth taxes, it is "difficult to firmly argue that wealth taxes would have negative effects on entrepreneurship. The magnitude of the effects of wealth taxes on entrepreneurship is also unclear".

A 2022 study found that wealth taxes are most likely to be implemented in the aftermath of major economic recessions.

Current examples
Argentina: It is named Impuesto sobre los Bienes Personales.  For assets held within Argentina, the tax is progressive from 0.50% on assets above ARS 3,000,000 (approx.  at April 2021 official exchange rate) to 1.25% on assets above ARS 18,000,000 (approx.  at April 2021 official exchange rate).  For assets held outside of Argentina, the tax is progressive from 0.70% on assets above ARS 3,000,000 to 2.25% on assets above ARS 18,000,000.
Colombia: On January 1, 2019, the Senate passed a tax reform bill that includes a lower corporate tax rate, a new tax rate for financial corporations, and a new wealth tax. For the years 2019, 2020, and 2021, the new wealth (equity) tax has been set at 1% for Colombian-resident individuals' worldwide net worth, and 1% for non-resident individuals on Colombian properties only, such as real estate, yachts, artwork, vessels, ships, and other assets with a net equity of at least COP5 billion. Shares in Colombian firms, accounts receivable from Colombian debtors, some portfolio assets, and financial lease agreements are all exempt from the tax. Following the COVID-19 pandemic, the richest Colombians will face higher taxes on wages, dividends, and properties, as well as a one-time "solidarity levy" on high incomes. All of which is part of a new bill that was sent to congress in April 2021. The bill aims to collect about 25 trillion pesos a year through new taxes and budget restraints, equating to 2.2 percent of GDP.
France: Until 2017, there was a solidarity tax on wealth on any net assets above €800,000 for those with total net worth of €1,300,000 or more. Marginal rates ranged from 0.5% to 1.5%. In 2007, it collected €4.07 billion, accounting for 1.4% of total revenue. From 2018 onwards, it has been replaced by a wealth tax on real estate, exonerating all financial assets.
Spain: There is a tax called Patrimonio. The tax rate is progressive, from 0.2 to 3.75% of net assets above the threshold of €700,000 after €300,000 primary residence allowance. The exact amount varies between regions.
Netherlands: There is a tax called vermogensrendementheffing. Although its name (wealth yield tax) suggests that it is a tax on the yield of wealth, it qualifies as a wealth tax, since the actual yield (whether positive or negative) is not taken into account in its calculation. Up to and including 2016, the rate was fixed at 1.2% (30% taxation over an assumed yield of 4%). From the fiscal year of 2017 onwards, the tax rate progresses with wealth. See Income tax in the Netherlands. In addition to the vermogensrendementheffing, owners of real estate pay a tax called onroerendezaakbelasting, which is based on the estimated value of the real estate they own. This is a local tax, levied by the city council where the property is located.
Norway: 0.7% (municipal) and 0.15% (national) a total of 0.85% levied on net assets exceeding 1,500,000 kr (approx. ) as of 2019. For tax purposes, the value of the primary residence is valued to 25% of the market value, secondary residences to 90% of the market value, while working capital such as commercial real estate, stocks, and stock funds are valued at various percentages. The Conservative Party, Progress Party and the Liberal Party have stated that they aim to reduce and eventually eliminate the wealth tax.
Switzerland: A progressive wealth tax that varies by residence location. Wealth tax is levied against worldwide assets of Swiss residents, but it is not levied against assets in Switzerland held by non-residents. 
Italy: Two wealth taxes are imposed. One, IVIE, is a 0.76% tax imposed on real assets held outside Italy. The values of such assets are determined by purchase price or current market value. Property taxes paid in the country where the real estate exists can offset IVIE.  Another tax, IVAFE, is 0.20% and is levied on all financial assets located outside the country, including, so far as the language seems to imply, individual pension schemes such as 401(k)s and IRAs in the US.
Belgium: The Act of 7 February 2018, which is effectively a "wealth tax," imposes a 0.15% annual tax on financial instruments kept in securities accounts worth more than €500,000.

Historical examples
Ancient Athens had a wealth tax called eisphora (see symmoria), and a wealth registry consisting of self-assessments (τίμημα), limited to the wealthiest. The registry was not very accurate.

Iceland had a wealth tax until 2006 and a temporary wealth tax reintroduced in 2010 for four years. The tax was levied at a rate of 1.5% on net assets exceeding 75,000,000 kr for individuals and 100,000,000 kr for married couples.

Similar to Iceland, Denmark taxed household income above a certain exemption threshold, which was about the 98th percentile of the wealth distribution, until 1997. A dozen OECD countries imposed similar taxes until the 1990s, but the Danish wealth tax was the highest of its kind. Until the late 1980s, the marginal tax rate on wealth was 2.2 percent, leading to a very high rate on the return on wealth. After minimizing the tax for some years, the Danish government eventually abolished the tax altogether in 1997.

Some other European countries have discontinued this kind of tax in recent years:  Germany (1997), Finland (2006), Luxembourg (2006) and Sweden (2007).

In the United Kingdom and other countries, property (real estate) is often a person's main asset, and has been taxed – for example, the window tax of 1696, the rates, to some extent the Council Tax.

Proposed examples

USA 
Senators Elizabeth Warren and Bernie Sanders included a billionaire wealth tax in their campaign platforms during the 2020 United States Presidential Election. A February, 2020, poll found 67% of registered American voters supported a wealth tax on billionaires, with support at 85% of Democrats, 66% of independent voters, and 47% of Republicans. While commentators have raised concerns:

France 
In France, the left candidate at the presidential election of 2022, Jean-Luc Mélenchon, proposed to tax the wealth income as the labour income. Also he wanted to increase inheritance tax on the highest estates by accounting for all gifts and inheritances received throughout life and create a maximum inheritance of 12 million euros (i.e. 100 times the median net wealth).

Germany 
In order to bridge the wealth gap between rich and poor in Germany, the Social Democratic Party of Germany called for a nationwide wealth tax to be reintroduced in 2019. According to the proposed tax reform, wealthy households would be required to pay an extra tax between 1% and 1.5%. A single household would need to pay 1% of their net worth on every euro surpassing €2 Million and married couple would have to pay for every euro surpassing €4 Million. A married household with a combined net worth of €4.2 Million would have to pay an annual wealth tax of €2,000. The proposition was eventually vetoed by the CDU/CSU and therefore never again considered.

Concentration of wealth

In 2014, French economist Thomas Piketty published a widely discussed book entitled Capital in the Twenty-First Century that starts with the observation that economic inequality is increasing and proposes wealth taxes as a countermeasure. The central thesis of the book is that inequality is not an accident, but rather a feature of capitalism, and can only be reversed through state interventionism. The book thus argues that unless capitalism is reformed, the very democratic order will be threatened. At the core of this thesis is the notion that when the rate of return on capital is greater than the rate of economic growth over the long term, the result is the concentration of wealth, and this unequal distribution of wealth causes social and economic instability. Piketty proposes a global system of progressive wealth taxes to help reduce inequality and avoid the trend towards a vast majority of wealth coming under the control of a tiny minority. This analysis was hailed as a major and important work by some economists. Other economists have challenged Piketty's proposals and interpretations.

France 
In 2017, when introducing the fiscal reform of the solidarity wealth tax, the government of the French president Emmanuel Macron used the first argument of capital flight. The other argument stated by the comity of evaluation of reforms on wealth fiscalism was that the previous wealth tax was not enough progressive for the top 0.1% wealthier.
The “IFI” as the “ISF” are wealth tax thus they concerned high earners. A big part of people paying this tax are in the ninth decile of income distribution and the “IFI” represents one over two household in the wealthiest 0.01%. Therefore, in the general tax system, the “IFI” contributes, as did the ISF, to make the tax system more progressive. But this progressivity has limits: “the IFI represents on average 0.1% of income around the ninth decile and 1.2% of income of 0.1% of very well-off households in 2018. While the income tax rate under the ISF was stable overall, within the top 0.1% of income, the income tax rate under of the IFI declines for the wealthiest and falls to 0.6% for the top 0.01%.” 
Broadly, this reform largely benefits to the 0.1% wealthier and did not make this wealth tax more progressive as it was supposed to be. In fact, it reduced the number of accountable people of wealth tax leaving the country but in term  of investment, the gains of this reforms has been traduced in an increasing of dividend on capital earnings (37.4 billion from non-financial society had been paid) and not on direct investment on corporate (see “Capital flight”).  In average and from different studies, those fiscal reforms benefited more to top-wealthier households. For Ben Jelloul and al. (2019), the reforms benefit for the top 1% more wealthier household with +5.5 point of disposable revenue. For Madec and al. (2019) it had affected on the top 2% of the wealthier households and for Pasquier and Sicsic (2019), the 5% of the top distribution perceived 57% of the gain of the fiscal reform.

Revenue
Revenue from a wealth tax scheme depends largely on the presence of net wealth and wealth inequality within the target country. Many plans include tax brackets, where a certain portion of the individual's wealth will be taxed at a given rate and any wealth beyond that amount will be taxed at a different rate.

A small number of countries have been using wealth tax regimes for some time. Revenues earned from wealth tax schemes vary by country from 0.98% of GDP in Switzerland to 0.22% in France, for example. 2020 United States presidential candidate Elizabeth Warren claimed a wealth tax plan could generate 1.4% of GDP in revenue for the United States.

According to data from the Organisation for Economic Co-operation and Development (OECD), the revenues generated from wealth taxes account for about 0.46% of all tax revenue on average in 2018 for countries which have wealth tax schemes in place. However this varies from country to country, the highest would be that of Luxembourg where it accounted for 7.18% of total tax revenue in 2018, the lowest would be Germany where it accounted for 0.03% of total tax revenue in 2018.

Estimates for a wealth tax's potential revenue in the United States vary. Several Democratic presidential candidates in the 2020 election have proposed wealth tax plans. Elizabeth Warren, for example, has proposed a wealth tax of 2% on net wealth above  and 6% above . Separate estimates from campaign advisors and economists Emmanuel Saez and Gabriel Zucman put the revenue at about 1% of GDP per year, in alignment with USD revenue estimates. Additionally, the Tax Foundation estimates 2020 presidential candidate Senator Bernie Sanders' wealth tax plan would collect  between 2020 and 2029.

Previous proposals for a wealth tax in the United States had already existed. Senator Huey Long of Louisiana proposed a wealth tax as part of his Share Our Wealth movement in 1934. Eileen Myles proposed a net assets tax in her presidential campaign in 1992, as did Donald Trump during his presidential campaign in 2000.

A net wealth tax may also be designed to be revenue-neutral if it is used to broaden the tax base, stabilize the economy, and reduce individual income and other taxes.

Effect on investment

A wealth tax serves as a negative reinforcer ("use it or lose it"), which incentivizes the productive use of assets (rather than letting assets accumulate without being used).  According to University of Pennsylvania Law School professors David Shakow and Reed Shuldiner, "a wealth tax also taxes capital that is not productively employed. Thus, a wealth tax can be viewed as a tax on potential income from capital." Net wealth taxes can complement rather than replace gift taxes, capital gains taxes, and inheritance taxes to increase administrability and the effectiveness of enforcement efforts.

In their article, "Investment Effects of Wealth Taxes Under Uncertainty and Irreversibility," Rainer Niemann and Caren Sureth-Sloane found that the effects of wealth taxation on investment mainly depends upon the tax method employed and the broadness of the wealth threshold for taxation. Niemann and Sureth-Sloane found that, "Broadening the wealth tax base tends to accelerate investment during high interest rate periods." Caren Sureth and Ralf Maiterth concluded that wealth tax revenues from entrepreneurs may decrease in the long term and the revenue from a wealth tax may be negative if the wealth taxation thresholds are too low.

Saez and Zucman are two economists that worked on the "Ultra-Millionaire Tax" proposed by Senator Elizabeth Warren. In their paper, "Progressive Wealth Taxation," they assert that a potential wealth tax in the United States needs necessary parameters to limit detrimental effects on investment. One parameter is a high wealth threshold to limit direct taxation on small business and entrepreneurship. The academic literature on the effects of wealth taxation on investment incentives are inconclusive in the United States; Saez and Zucman assert there are three reasons wealth taxes in European countries are weak comparisons to the United States when analyzing potential effects on investment.  First, they claim tax competition between European countries allows for individuals to avoid taxation by allocating assets to a different country. Reallocating assets to avoid taxation is more difficult in the United States because tax filings apply equally to United States citizens no matter the country of current residence. Second, low exemption thresholds caused liquidity problems for some individuals who were on the lower end of wealth taxation thresholds. Third, they contend European wealth taxes need modernization and improved methods for systematic information gathering.

Further proponents for a wealth tax claim it could have positive effects on investment in the United States. Some extremely wealthy people use their assets in unproductive ways. For example, an entrepreneur could generate much higher returns (though could conversely lose much more capital operating on leverage) than a wealthy individual with a conservative investment such as United States Treasury Bonds.
 
A wealth tax could lead to negative effects on investment, saving, and economic growth. In the article, "Economic effects of wealth taxation," Kyle Pomerleau states, "A wealth tax, even levied at an apparently low annual rate, places a significant burden on saving." The degree of this impact on savings and investments is reliant on the openness of the United States economy. A wealth tax would shrink national saving and increase foreign ownership of assets. The potential decrease in national savings leads to a decrease in capital stock. An estimate from the Penn Wharton Budget Model indicates that if the revenue from the wealth tax proposed by Elizabeth Warren were used to finance non-productive government spending, GDP would decrease by 2.1 percent by 2050, capital stock would decrease by 6.5 percent, and wages would decrease by 2.3 percent. Some opponents also point out that redistribution through a wealth tax is an inherently counterintuitive way to foster economic growth. Richard Epstein, a senior fellow at the Hoover Institution, contents, "The classical liberal approach wants to simplify taxation and reduce regulation to spur growth. Plain old growth is a much better social tonic that the toxic Warren Wealth Tax."

Housing and consumer debt

Unlike property taxes that fall on the full value of a property, a net wealth tax only taxes equity (value above debt).  This could benefit those with mortgages, student loans, automobile loans, consumer loans, etc.

Criticisms

There are many arguments against the implementation of a wealth tax, including claims that a wealth tax would be unconstitutional (in the United States), that property would be too hard to value, and that wealth taxes would reduce the rate of innovation.

Capital flight

A 2006 article in The Washington Post titled "Old Money, New Money Flee France and Its Wealth Tax" pointed out some of the harm caused by France's wealth tax. The article gave examples of how the tax caused capital flight, brain drain, loss of jobs, and, ultimately, a net loss in tax revenue.

In fact the wealth tax named "Impôt sur les Grandes Fortunes" (IGF) ["tax on great wealth"] had been created in 1980, then suppressed in 1986 before finally being reintroduced in 1988 under the name “Impôt de Solidarité sur la Fortune” (ISF) ["solidarity tax on wealth"]. In 1999 a new higher tax category was added which increased the money collected from 0.09% of GDP in 1990 to 0.16% in 2004.

For example, in 2003, 370 ISF’s accountables people left France and it continued to grow year by year except between 2010 and 2011 when the tax threshold has been raised and accountable people were discarded from it. This capital flight only decrease after 2015 and in 2017 when the French government announced that it will suppress this tax. After the reforms implementation, there were only 163 departures of wealth tax people in 2018 
The capital flight was one of the argument to reforms the wealth tax. After 2017, in the financial law of 2018, the new wealth tax was introduced with other tax reforms. The fiscal reform thus included a unique forfeit tax on saving, combined with the replacement of ISF by the IFI “Impôt sur la Fortune Immobilière” (IFI) which reduce the wealth tax to real-estate propriety only and finally a decrease of the corporate tax. This argument of capital flight takes its roots on an economic theory, the runoff theory. By decreasing the wealth tax, the wealth households are supposed to come back inside the country to invest and thus raised the GDP growth which will have effect on all the population by reducing unemployment and boost the economy. In France, the fiscal reform did not have the expected effects of runoff. In fact, the capital flight due to wealth tax household leaving only represented 0.3% and 0.5% of the total amount of money collected by the solidarity tax on wealth, between 2004 and 2015. On the other hand, this decrease of the wealth tax represented an income loss of 2.9 billion for the state 

In term of investment, there were fewer investments in real-estate from people accountable of wealth tax. However, this movement could be explained more by the increase in household income, the low level of interest rates on mortgage loans and the general dynamics of the real estate market than by a sale, on the part of wealthy households, of property subject to the IFI for the benefit of investments in transferable securities, therefore the result in investment on corporate are not significant. Moreover, the fiscal reform on wealth tax had an insignificant level at the macroeconomic level for the corporate funds. For example, in 2020 for the non-financial society, the part of listed and non-listed share has been lower from the average of the previous period 2001-2019. It is also hard to measure the effect on corporate investment because of the Covid-19 crises which caused a shut-down of the economy in 2020.

Valuation issues

In 2012, the Wall Street Journal wrote that: "the wealth tax has a fatal flaw: valuation. It has been estimated that 62% of the wealth of the top 1% is "non-financial" – i.e., vehicles, real estate, and (most importantly) private business. Private businesses account for nearly 40% of their wealth and are the largest single category." A particular issue for small business owners is that they cannot accurately value their private business until it is sold.  Furthermore, business owners could easily make their businesses look much less valuable than they really are, through accounting, valuations and assumptions about the future.  "Even the rich don't know exactly what they're worth in any given moment."

Examples of such fraud and malfeasance were revealed in 2013, when French budget minister Jérôme Cahuzac was discovered shifting financial assets into Swiss bank accounts in order to avoid the wealth tax.  After further investigation, a French finance ministry official said, "A number of government officials minimised their wealth, by negligence or with intent, but without exceeding 5–10 per cent of their real worth ... however, there are some who have deliberately tried to deceive the authorities." Yet again, in October 2014, France's Finance chairman and President of the National Assembly, Gilles Carrez, was found to have avoided paying the French wealth tax (ISF) for three years by applying a 30 percent tax allowance on one of his homes.  However, he had previously converted the home into an SCI, a private, limited company to be used for rental purposes.  The 30 percent allowance does not apply to SCI holdings. Once this was revealed, Carrez declared, "if the tax authorities think that I should pay the wealth tax, I won't argue." Carrez is one of more than 60 French parliamentarians battling with the tax offices over 'dodgy' asset declarations.

Moreover, this problem of wealth devaluation is undermined by the administration itself. For example, in France in 1999, the government introduced the notion of “the measured application of the tax law”. But this application of the law is mostly reserved for the self-declared tax, like the wealth tax. Its mean that if there is a fraud in the declaration, there will be no sanction if the household concerned correct his mistake, even if it might have been done in purpose.
This flexibility granted to self-declared taxes is indeed unequal. In fact the other tax that concerned most of the households, like income taxes, can’t be self-declared and this fraud flexibility benefits only to the richer household. More broadly, this self-declaration tax has developed what the sociologist Alexis Spire called “tax law domestication”, which enable richest part of the population to employed fiscal specialist to optimize their declaration and minimize the amount of the wealth tax. Once again those opportunity of optimization, as the flexibility in sanctions are unequally distributed in the tax spectrum and thus in the different part of the population.

Social effects

Opponents of wealth taxes have argued that there is "an undercurrent of envy in the campaign against extremes of wealth." Two Yale University/London School of Economics studies (2006, 2008) on relative income yielded results asserting that 50 percent of the public would prefer to earn less money, as long as they earned as much or more than their neighbor.

Many analysts and scholars assert that since wealth taxes are a form of direct asset collection, as well as double-taxation, they are antithetical to personal freedom and individual liberty. They further contend that free nations should have no business helping themselves arbitrarily to the personal belongings of any group of its citizens. Further, these opponents may say wealth taxes place the authority of the government ahead of the rights of the individual, and ultimately undermine the concept of personal sovereignty.  The Daily Telegraph editor Allister Heath critically described wealth taxes as Marxian in concept and ethically destructive to the values of democracies, "Taxing already acquired property drastically alters the relationship between citizen and state: we become leaseholders, rather than freeholders, with accumulated taxes over long periods of time eventually "returning" our wealth to the state. It breaches a key principle that has made this country great: the gradual expansion of property ownership and the democratisation of wealth."

Past repeals

In 2004, a study by the Institut de l'enterprise investigated why several European countries were eliminating wealth taxes and made the following observations: 1. Wealth taxes contributed to capital drain, promoting the flight of capital as well as discouraging investors from coming in.  2. Wealth taxes had high management cost and relatively low returns.  3. Wealth taxes distorted resource allocation, particularly involving certain exemptions and unequal valuation of assets.  In its summary, the institute found that the "wealth taxes were not as equitable as they appeared".

In a 2011 study, the London School of Economics examined wealth taxes that were being considered by the Labour party in the United Kingdom between 1974 and 1976 but were ultimately abandoned. The findings of the study revealed that the British evaluated similar programs in other countries and determined that the Spanish wealth tax may have contributed to a banking crisis and the French wealth tax had been undergoing review by its government for being unpopular and overly complex.  As efforts progressed, concerns were developing over the practicality and implementation of wealth taxes as well as worry that they would undermine confidence in the British economy.  Eventually, plans were dropped.  Former British Chancellor Denis Healey concluded that attempting to implement wealth taxes was a mistake, "We had committed ourselves to a Wealth Tax: but in five years I found it impossible to draft one which would yield enough revenue to be worth the administrative cost and political hassle."  The conclusion of the study stated that there were lingering questions, such as the impacts on personal saving and small business investment, consequences of capital flight, complexity of implementation, and ability to raise predicted revenues that must be adequately addressed before further consideration of wealth taxes.

Legal impediments

United States
 See also Pollock v. Farmers' Loan & Trust Co.; Sixteenth Amendment to the United States Constitution

In part because a wealth tax has never been implemented in the United States, there is no legal consensus about its constitutionality. As evidenced below, much scholarly debate on the topic hinges on whether or not such a tax is understood to be a "direct tax," per Article 1, Section 9 of the Constitution, which requires that the burden of "direct taxes" be apportioned across the states by their population.

Barry L. Isaacs interprets current case law in the United States to hold that a wealth tax is a direct tax under Article 1, Section 9. Given the extreme difficulty of apportioning a wealth tax by state population, the implementation of a wealth tax in the United States would require either a constitutional amendment or the overturning of current case law. Unlike federal wealth taxes, states and localities are not bound by Article 1, Section 9, which is why they are able to levy taxes on real estate.

Other legal scholars have argued that a wealth tax does not represent a direct tax and that such a tax could be implemented in the United States without a constitutional amendment. In a lengthy essay from 2018, authors in the Indiana Journal of Law argued that "... the belief that the U.S. Constitution effectively makes a national wealth tax impossible ... is wrong." The authors noted that in the 1796 Supreme Court decision for Hylton v. United States, Supreme Court justices who had personally taken part in the creation of the U.S. Constitution "unanimously rejected a challenge to the constitutionality of an annual tax on carriages, a tax akin to a national wealth tax in that it taxed a luxury property."  However, Alexander Hamilton, who supported the carriage tax, told the Supreme Court that it was constitutional because it was an "excise tax", not a direct tax. Hamilton's brief defines direct taxes as "Capitation or poll taxes, taxes on lands and buildings, general assessments, whether on the whole property of individuals or on their whole real or personal estate" which would include the wealth tax. Tax scholars have repeatedly noted that the critical difference between income taxes and wealth taxes, the realization requirement, is a matter of administrative convenience, not a constitutional requirement.

To prevent capital flight, proponents of wealth taxes have argued for the implementation of a one-time exit tax on high net worth individuals who renounce their citizenship and leave the country. An additional constitutional objection to such a tax could be raised on the grounds that it violates the takings clause of the Fifth Amendment, which prohibits the federal government from taking private property for public use without just compensation.

Germany

The Federal Constitutional Court of Germany in Karlsruhe found that wealth taxes "would need to be confiscatory in order to bring about any real redistribution". In addition, the court held that the sum of wealth tax and income tax should not be greater than half of a taxpayer's income. "The tax thus gives rise to a dilemma: either it is ineffective in fighting inequalities, or it is confiscatory – and it is for that reason that the Germans chose to eliminate it." Thus, finding such wealth taxes unconstitutional in 1995. In 2006, the Constitutional Court revised this decision on the so-called "Halbteilungsgrundsatz", stating that "From the property guarantee of the Basic Law, no generally binding absolute upper limit of taxation in the vicinity of a half division can be derived."

See also

 Ad valorem tax
 Capital in the Twenty-First Century
 Capital levy (a one-off wealth tax)
 Economic inequality#Environment; addressing human overpopulation having similar effects to decrease wealth gap
 Endowment tax
 Inheritance tax
 Land value tax
 Panama Papers
 Paradise Papers
 Progressive tax
 Property tax
 Redistribution of income and wealth
 Tax exporting
 Wealth concentration
 Wealth inequality in the United States
 Welfare state
 World taxation system
 Zakat

References

Further reading
 Alexandra Thornton and Galen Hendricks, Ending Special Tax Treatment for the Very Wealthy, Center for American Progress, 4 June 2019. Ending Special Tax Treatment for the Very Wealthy The report summarizes the problem (gross inequality) and its cause ("special tax treatment for the [extremely rich]"), and specific "ways to rebalance the tax code and put the economy on a better track."
 Scheuer, Florian; Slemrod, Joel (August 2, 2020). "Taxation and the Superrich". Annual Review of Economics. 12 (1): 189–211.
Scheuer, Florian; Slemrod, Joel. 2021. "Taxing Our Wealth." Journal of Economic Perspectives.

Personal taxes
Taxation and redistribution
Tax